Craugastor psephosypharus is a species of frog in the family Craugastoridae.
It is found in Belize, Guatemala, and possibly Honduras.
Its natural habitats are subtropical or tropical moist lowland forests, subtropical or tropical moist montane forests, rocky areas, and caves.
It is threatened by habitat loss.

References

psephosypharus
Amphibians described in 1994
Taxonomy articles created by Polbot